The Republic of China (Taiwan) passport is the passport issued to nationals of the Republic of China (ROC), commonly known as Taiwan. The ROC passport is also generally referred to as a Taiwanese passport. As of September 2020, approximately 60.87 percent of Taiwanese citizens possess a valid passport.

The Republic of China Passport were Chinese official passports prior to 1949. The earliest edition of the ROC passport which can be verified is the one issued by the Beiyang government in 1919. The current version of passport could be traced back to the prototype that published in 1929 by the Kuomintang-led Nationalist government (1927–1948) based in Nanjing. After the defeat of Kuomintang in the Chinese Civil War, the jurisdiction of the ROC government was effectively limited to the Taiwan Area, thus making it a valid travel document only issued in Taiwan. All passports published in Taiwan since 2008 have been biometric.

The status and international recognition of the ROC passport is complicated due to the political status of Taiwan. The Nationality Law of the Republic of China considers not only residents of Taiwan, Penghu, Kinmen, and Matsu, but eligible overseas Chinese and Chinese residents of Mainland China, Hong Kong, and Macau, to be nationals of the Republic of China. It is worth noting that the vast majority of Chinese-descent residents in Hong Kong, Macau or Mainland China are also nationals of the People's Republic of China (PRC) and do not hold any identification documents issued by the ROC. Individuals in the latter two categories may be eligible for a ROC passport under certain conditions, but do not have household registration in Taiwan (i.e. they are "nationals without household registration", or "NWOHR"), and thus do not enjoy the right of abode in Taiwan. Countries granting visa-free privileges to Taiwan passport holders often require a Taiwanese National ID number imprinted on the passport's biodata page, which signifies the holder's right of abode in Taiwan.

The Republic of China (Taiwan) passport is one of five passports with the most improved rating globally since 2006 in terms of the number of countries that its holders may visit without a visa. As of  September 2020, holders of ordinary Republic of China passports (for ROC nationals with Taiwan area household registration who therefore possess right of abode in Taiwan and also the right to obtain a National Identity Card) had visa-free or visa on arrival access to 149 countries and territories, with additional 20 countries eligible for granting eVisas, ranking the Republic of China (Taiwan) passport 32nd in the world in terms of travel freedom (tied with the Mauritius and St. Vincent and the Grenadines passports), according to the Henley Passport Index 2020.

Passport appearance

First generation biometric passport
The first generation biometric passports were introduced on 29 December 2008. The Republic of China (Taiwan) became the 60th country in the world to issue biometric passports when they were introduced.

Cover
The cover of the ordinary Republic of China (Taiwan) passport is dark green, with the ROC national emblem – Blue Sky with a White Sun – in the middle. On the top is the official name of the country, "REPUBLIC OF CHINA", in Traditional Chinese characters. It is also written in English in fine print circling the national emblem. Below the national emblem, the word "TAIWAN" is printed in English only and "PASSPORT" is printed in both Traditional Chinese and English. At the bottom is the biometric passport symbol.

The cover of the official passport is brown and has the words "OFFICIAL PASSPORT" on the cover, and the diplomatic passport is dark blue with "DIPLOMATIC PASSPORT" on the cover.

Request page
The first page of the passport is the passport note page and printed with the following request,  anti-counterfeiting printing shows the shape of the island of Taiwan at the top and word TAIWAN at the bottom.
In Traditional Chinese
中華民國外交部部長茲請各國有關機關對持用本護照之中華民國國民允予自由通行，並請必要時儘量予以協助及保護。
In English

Data page

Personal biodata page information for the passport holder and the machine readable zone are listed below.

The biodata page is protected by a plastic anti-counterfeiting layer with laser holograms of the country code TWN and broad-tailed swallowtail butterfly, an endemic species of Taiwan.

Following the passage of an amendment to Article 14 of the Enforcement Rules of the Passport Act on 9 August 2019, romanization can take place from any of Taiwan's national languages, which include Hakka, Hoklo, and Formosan languages spoken by indigenous peoples.

Inner pages 
The inner pages of a Republic of China (Taiwan) passport are in light purple. Its contents are:
 Personal data page in page 2
 Signature in page 3
 Amendments and endorsements from page 4 to page 7
 Visa pages from page 8 to page 47
 Remark pages from page 48 to page 50
Selected nature hotspots and famous sights of Taiwan are printed in the inner pages, each page also contains a transparent watermark of Jade Mountain, the highest peak of the country.

Back cover
A contactless biometric chip is embedded in the back cover page, with the warning as follows.
In Traditional Chinese:
本護照內植高感度電子晶片，使用上請視同攜帶式電子產品，並妥善保管。為維持護照最佳效能，請勿折壓、扭曲或在內頁穿孔、裝訂；並勿將護照曝曬於陽光下，或置於高溫、潮濕及電磁環境，或沾染化學藥品。
In English:

Second generation biometric passport 

The second generation biometric passport has been issued since 5 February 2018. It was originally scheduled to be rolled out on 25 December 2017, however the rollout was suspended a day later and did not resume until 5 February 2018 due to the Dulles Airport image controversy.

Passport regulations for nationals with household registration

Nationals with household registration in the Taiwan Area may apply for passports from the Bureau of Consular Affairs (BOCA) in Taipei or its branch offices in Kaohsiung, Hualien, Chiayi and Taichung with the following documents:
 Application form
 National Identification Card
 Two photos (3.5 × 4.5 cm)
First time applicants are required to submit their documents in person to the BOCA headquarters or a BOCA branch.
Processing time: Four working days.
Validity period: Starting from 21 May 2000, the validity period for an ordinary passport is generally 10 years and 1 day but for applicants aged under 15, it is 5 years and for male citizens who have not completed their conscription duty it is only 3 years.
Application fee: Effective since 1 January 2013, the application fee for a 10-year passport is NT$1,300; for a passport with restricted validity period is NT$900. In comparison, the cost of manufacturing a passport is NT$1,361, regardless of the validity period.

Due to mandatory military service for men, travel restrictions are placed on male citizens from the age of 15 until they have completed their military service. When a passport is issued to a such citizen, a stamp with the following words will be shown on the remarks page, and a sticker which describes the regulation will be attached to the back cover of the passport.
In Traditional Chinese:
持照人出國應經核准，尙未履行兵役義務。
Translation: The bearer needs a permission to travel abroad and has not yet completed his military service.
Before traveling, the holder needs to apply for permission to travel overseas with the National Immigration Agency or the conscription administration near his residence. Permission is granted in the form of a stamp on the remarks page, including the expiration date and the issuing authority.

Passport regulations for nationals without household registration 

Around 60,000 Taiwan passport holders are NWOHRs, accounting for approximately 0.5% of total valid passports. NWOHRs are overseas nationals without household registration in Taiwan, and hence do not have the right of abode in Taiwan, Penghu, Kinmen, Matsu and other outlying islands.

Application 
Overseas nationals can only apply for a passport from an embassy, consulate or Taipei Economic and Cultural Representative Office near their residing country with the following document.
 Application form
 A certificate of nationality of the Republic of China (Taiwan)
 Two photos (3.5 × 4.5 cm)
The Republic of China nationality law adopts the jus sanguinis principle. The applicant's nationality may be established through ancestral ties. Various documents may be used as proof, see the eligibility paragraph for more information thereto.
Application fee: For a 10-year passport is US$45, for a passport with restricted validity period is US$31.

Travel requirements and limitations
Unlike residents of Taiwan, NWOHRs do not automatically have right of abode in Taiwan. They are required to apply for an entry permit to enter Taiwan prior to their travel if they are not exempted. The application must be submitted to the embassy, consulate or Taipei Economic and Cultural Representative Office of their country of residence. Once the application is approved, a visa-like permit will be affixed on the visa page.
 This legal situation is rather similar to that of British Overseas Citizens, who have no automatic right of abode in the United Kingdom or any other British dependency or territory. 
 In the United States, passports without a National ID number (without unrestricted right to enter and/or reside in Taiwan) do not satisfy the definition of a passport under INA 101(a)(30). Therefore, the bearers of such passports are considered stateless for visa issuing purposes.

Because of the lack of right of abode, page 50 of NWOHR passports show the following words in ink.
In Traditional Chinese:
本護照不適用部分國家之免簽證計劃.
Translation: "This passport is not eligible for visa waiver programs of some countries according to their regulations."

Unlike passports of Taiwanese residents, passports for NWOHRs contain a special stamp that indicates non-resident status and exempts holders from conscription.

Eligibility for Taiwan passports

The ROC was founded in 1912 governing Mainland China while Taiwan was part of Japan. The earliest verifiable ROC passports were issued by the Beiyang Government in Beijing in September 1919, and an ROC passport booklet was first issued by Beiyang Foreign Minister Wellington Koo Wei-chun in April 1922. After the surrender of the Japanese Empire in 1945, the Republic of China was given administrative jurisdiction over Taiwan and maintained control of it ever since. At the end of the Chinese Civil War in 1949, the ROC lost its control of Mainland China to the Chinese Communist Party, which established the People's Republic of China (PRC). Henceforth, the ROC has been able to administer only Taiwan and some islands off the Mainland's coast. Maintaining the view that it is still the legitimate government of the whole of China, the ROC does not formally recognize the legitimacy of PRC. It has also constitutionally defined all the territory under its control as the "Free Area" (or the "Taiwan Area") and the territory outside Taiwan Area as the "Mainland Area". The ROC constitution allows the ROC government to make laws for one Area of the country without affecting the other Area..

However, permanent residents in the Mainland Area, Hong Kong or Macau are not generally eligible to obtain a ROC passport [Passport Act, Article 6]. Furthermore, Overseas Chinese applicants normally must submit one of the following forms of proof of ROC nationality [Passport Act Enforcement Rules, Article 4]:
 A ROC passport;
 A Certificate of Overseas Chinese status, issued on the basis of proof of ROC nationality;
 Proof of ROC nationality for a parent or ancestor, together with proof of descent.

As the first ROC nationality law, in effect from 5 February 1929 to 9 February 2000, only permitted ROC national fathers to pass nationality down to the descendants, any person who was born on or before 9 February 1980 to an ROC national mother and a foreign father is not a ROC national, regardless of place of birth.

There are certain exceptions to this in certain cases for first and second generation emigrants, but in general an applicant will be unable to obtain a ROC passport unless he already holds ROC-issued nationality documentation for himself or an ancestor.

Therefore, for a person to obtain a ROC passport, one of the following must normally apply:
 The person first obtained proof of ROC nationality before 1949, when the ROC controlled the Mainland Area; or
 The person first obtained a ROC passport or a Certificate of Overseas Chinese status before 1 July 1997 as a resident of Hong Kong, or before 20 December 1999 as resident of Macau; or
 The person first obtained a ROC passport before 2002, as an Overseas-born Chinese, on the basis of Chinese ethnicity, before the Passport Act Enforcement Rules were revised to prevent this; or
 The person obtained an ROC passport after emigrating overseas from the Mainland Area [Passport Act Enforcement Rules, Article 18]; or	
 The person obtained an ROC passport after emigrating overseas from Hong Kong or Macau, whilst not holding a foreign passport other than a BN(O) passport [Passport Act Enforcement Rules, Article 19], or after being born overseas to a parent who so emigrated; or
 The person has an ancestor in one of the previous categories (i.e. the ancestor actually obtained the ROC document, as opposed to merely having the right to do so), and the chain of descent is through the male line until 9 February 1980 (afterwards the chain of descent can be through the mother or father).
The interior is in traditional Chinese characters and English. Until the mid-1990s, the passport also contained an entry for provincial ancestry (籍貫), stating the Chinese province and county of one's ancestral home, but this field has been eliminated. However, the Chinese province or county of birth is still listed in the birthplace entry if the passport holder was born in either Mainland China or Taiwan.

Visa requirements

Visa requirements for Taiwan passport holders are administrative entry restrictions by the authorities of other states placed on nationals of Taiwan. As of 7 January 2020, holders of ordinary Taiwan passports (for ROC nationals with Taiwan area household registration who therefore possess right of abode in Taiwan and also the right to obtain a National Identity Card) had visa-free or visa on arrival access to 146 countries and territories, ranking the Taiwan passport 32nd in the world in terms of travel freedom (tied with the Mauritius and St. Vincent and the Grenadines passports), according to the Henley Passport Index 2020. Additionally, Arton Capital's Passport Index ranked the ordinary Taiwan passport 30th in the world in terms of travel freedom, with a visa-free score of 135 (tied with Panamanian passports), as of 12 January 2020.

Visa requirements for ROC nationals without household registration (NWOHR), i.e., nationals of Taiwan who do not possess right of abode in Taiwan and hence ineligible for a National Identity Card, are different. Unlike ROC nationals with household registration in Taiwan, NWOHRs cannot apply for the Australian Electronic Travel Authority (ETA) and must instead apply for a subclass 600 visa in order to visit Australia. NWOHRs also require visas to visit Canada, Japan, New Zealand, the Schengen Area (including future member states Romania, Bulgaria, Croatia and Cyprus), the United Kingdom and the United States (where NWOHRs are considered stateless and their visas issued on a separate form).

Limitations in usage

Even though the Republic of China maintains official relations with only 15 countries, the ROC passport is still accepted as a valid travel document in most countries of the world. Although Taiwanese enjoy visa-free status in 148 countries, some countries, pursuant to their policies on Taiwan's political status, refuse to visé or stamp ROC passports, and instead issue visas on a separate travel document or a separate piece of paper to Taiwanese travelers to avoid conveying any kind of diplomatic recognition to the ROC. The chart below only lists countries or territories which explicitly state that ROC passports are not accepted, while also requiring a visa or entry permit for ROC nationals prior to arrival.

Controversies

"Republic of Taiwan" sticker

In 2015, a pro-independence activist, Denis Chen, designed the Taiwan Passport Sticker (Republic of Taiwan sticker) to be placed on the front cover of ROC passports. The stickers re-brand the country's name as 「臺灣國」 (literally, State of Taiwan) and "Republic of Taiwan" , as well as replacing the existing national emblem of a Blue Sky with a White Sun with cartoons of either Jade Mountain, Formosan black bear, or pro-democracy activist Cheng Nan-jung.

Although applauded by pro-independence supporters, this move caused controversies in Taiwan's neighboring countries and regions, as well as the United States, since the alteration of passport covers might be a violation of immigration laws in other countries or regions and eventually cause the refusal of entry to holders of such passports.

Singapore was the first country in Asia to deny entry to holders of altered passports on 29 November 2015, and deported three ROC nationals for "altering their travel documents". Among the three, two immediately removed the Republic of Taiwan stickers upon the further inquiries by the Immigration and Checkpoints Authority (ICA) officers, but were eventually deported by Singapore to Taiwan. Another person had refused to remove such stickers and instead requested diplomatic representatives of Taiwan for consular protection, but was also deported in the end by ICA. The two Special Administrative Regions of China, Hong Kong and Macau, soon followed suit and refused to accept holders of such passports for entry. A spokesperson of Hong Kong Immigration Department said that any person who "altered the travel document without lawful authority, or, who possess or use altered travel document", is a violation of Immigration Ordinance and can be sentenced for up to 14 years in prison.

The American Institute in Taiwan (AIT) had, through diplomatic channels, notified the MOFA and confirmed that holders of such altered passports may be extensively questioned by the U.S. Customs and Border Protection (CBP) officers and be removed from the United States, and in March 2016, two travelers from Taiwan voluntarily removed Republic of Taiwan stickers because of the extensive questioning by CBP officers. The two travelers were eventually admitted into the U.S., while a CBP spokesperson warned that alterations of travel documents made by any person who is not authorized by the government of a country can render it invalid and will result the holder's refusal of admission to the U.S., and placing Republic of Taiwan stickers on passports is deemed to have altered the travel documents. Similar incident also occurred in Japan when a holder of altered passport was taken to secondary inspection. After being told that he would be deported, the man finally removed the Republic of Taiwan stickers and placed them on his T-shirt and was allowed into Japan.

Supporters of the stickers claimed that passports with Republic of Taiwan stickers were accepted in the United Arab Emirates and in Japan. In the latter case, the person who placed Republic of Taiwan sticker claimed that he was simply trying to block the word "China" from his passport. Holders of such passports were also allowed entry in the Philippines, although a Bureau of Immigration (BI) spokesperson claimed that the passenger would normally be thoroughly inspected and called the incident "a serious matter", while also said that the government would launch an investigation.

According to the BOCA, a total of 21 people had been denied entry by Singapore, Macau and Hong Kong since the end of 2015. Also, incidents were reported in Japan and the U.S. of the use of Republic of Taiwan stickers. The MOFA called upon travelers to not alter the cover of their travel documents so that they would not be denied entry.

From 2020, such problems have largely ceased to exist after the Taiwanese government issued new versions of passports that have reduced "Republic of China" to small texts surrounding the national emblem, and highlighted "Taiwan" instead.

Dulles Airport image incident

Page 5 of the redesigned second generation biometric passport, originally scheduled to roll out on 25 December 2017, was to feature an image of the iconic terminal 1 of Taiwan Taoyuan International Airport, a project of Chinese-American architect Tung-Yen Lin completed in 1979. On the same day, however, netizens on Facebook noticed that a picture of the terminal building of Washington Dulles International Airport was used on page 5 instead. Dulles's terminal, which was completed in 1962 and designed by renowned architect Eero Saarinen, had greatly inspired Lin's design of terminal 1, hence the two buildings bear a high degree of similarity.

The MOFA initially dismissed the reports in the morning of 26 December when a spokesperson of the ministry claimed that the photo was taken at Taoyuan Airport. Nearly 12 hours would pass before the MOFA acknowledged the error and stated that over 220,000 new passports were printed and delivered by the Central Engraving and Printing Plant (CEPP) and 285 of them, which were already recalled, had been delivered to applicants by the time the mistake was discovered. BOCA chief Agnes Chen took responsibility and resigned on 27 December as the rollout of the new passport was halted, and applicants were issued first generation biometric passports instead. It was later reported that an extra 330,000 undelivered blank booklets were already printed by the CEPP, bringing the number of total affected booklets to more than 550,000, and destroying those would cost the government NT$220 million. To reduce costs, the MOFA decided to print new stickers with the correct building which would cover page 5 and turn it into a travel warnings page from a blank amendment/endorsement page, a move that will cost a much smaller NT$16 million. In January 2018, the CEPP had also agreed to cover the NT$9.9 million manufacturing cost of the undelivered 330,000 booklets.

The second generation biometric passport with stickers on page 5 was officially rolled out on 5 February 2018, more than a month behind the original schedule, to ameliorate the controversy. MOFA confirmed that it had notified immigration authorities of foreign countries so that holders of passports with the sticker would not encounter difficulties when travelling. Two months later in April 2018, the Control Yuan had released a report on the incident, in which it placed the majority of the blame on the BOCA passport design group and group members' carelessness when researching images for the terminal. The report also highlighted the lack of communication between the BOCA and the CEPP, which failed to exercise due diligence on copyright issues and did not independently verify the correctness of the image due to the BOCA's status as a long-time customer. The report also strongly condemned the MOFA's initial dismissal of the incident.

On 4 May 2018, the BOCA announced that it had estimated that the initial stock of the 550,000 booklets with the sticker would be depleted by mid-May, and the new version without the sticker on page 5 would then be issued. The sticker-less version would continue to feature page 5, which now bears the correct terminal building, as a travel warnings page rather than an amendment/endorsement page.

References to "Taiwan"
The common English word "Taiwan" has been printed on the front of passports since 2003. This was added after an original proposal to add "Issued in Taiwan" was shelved after strong criticism from the mainland Chinese government the previous year.

On 22 July 2020, the Legislative Yuan passed two resolutions put forth by the ruling Democratic Progressive Party (DPP) that ask the executive branch of government to highlight "Taiwan" on passports and China Airlines' (CAL) aircraft. The resolutions require the Executive Yuan to work out measures to emphasize the word for "Taiwan" written in Chinese (台灣) and in English on the passport cover. The New Power Party has submitted proposals for new passport designs for public vote. The Kuomintang (KMT; Nationalist Party of China) has accused the DPP of revisionism and criticized President Tsai Ing-wen's administration for missing an opportunity to advertise the nation to the world due to its focus on its own ideological and political considerations.

Passport gallery

See also 
 Visa requirements for Taiwanese citizens
 Foreign relations of Taiwan

Notes

References

External links 

 Bureau of Consular Affairs

Foreign relations of Taiwan
Taiwan